The University of Missouri–St. Louis (UMSL) is a public research university in St. Louis, Missouri. Established in 1963, it is the newest of the four universities in the University of Missouri System. Located on the former grounds of Bellerive Country Club, the university's campus stretches into the municipalities of Bellerive, Bel-Nor and Normandy.  Additional facilities are located at the former site of Marillac College and at Grand Center, both in St. Louis city.

Bachelor's, Master's, and doctoral programs are offered through the College of Arts and Sciences, the College of Business Administration, the College of Education, the College of Nursing, the School of Social Work, and the College of Optometry. The business school is AACSB-accredited and is the only public university in the St. Louis area to also be AACSB-accredited in accounting. Preprofessional, a joint engineering program with Washington University in St. Louis, and evening programs are also offered. UMSL is home of an optometry school, providing its students with a doctorate (OD). The Pierre Laclede Honors College is UMSL's honors program. UMSL is classified among "R2: Doctoral Universities – High research activity".

The university contains two libraries: The Thomas Jefferson Library which is the main library of the university and the St. Louis Mercantile Library which was founded in 1846 and is the oldest library west of the Mississippi River.  The campus contains two stops on MetroLink, St. Louis' regional light rail system. A student center, academic buildings, parking structures, a performing arts center, and residential housing have been constructed over the past ten years as part of campus improvement programs. The university has a dual-enrollment agreement with Gulf University for Science and Technology, Kuwait. KWMU (90.7 FM), which is the flagship National Public Radio station in the St. Louis area and known on-air as St. Louis Public Radio, is owned by and licensed to UMSL.

UMSL has 10,431 students attending classes on-campus, compared to 6,010 students taking classes off-campus, which is mostly students dual-enrolled at area high schools. The university has the equivalent of 9,488 full-time students. UMSL has historically been a commuter school for the St. Louis, with only about 1200 students living on-campus.

History
The impetus for a college campus in its current location began in 1957 when members of the Bellerive Country Club put their 53-year-old club house and  grounds on the market for $1.3 million as they planned to move to larger quarters in Town and Country, Missouri.  At the same time members of Normandy, Missouri School District began debating the need of creating an affordable junior college to offer an alternative to the much more expensive privately owned Saint Louis University and Washington University in St. Louis.  Country Club members approached the Board and the asking price was dropped to $600,000.  A bond issue on September 30, 1958, received the necessary two-thirds majority and the golf club was turned over to Normandy on May 31, 1960.  A group of board members and citizens popularly referred to as "The Committee of Twenty-eight" began the process to set up the junior college.  The group met with Elmer Ellis, president of the University of Missouri.

At the time, MU was responsible for accrediting junior colleges.  Ellis suggested that the University of Missouri supervise the educational program at the school.  The terms required that 100 students attend the school. 140 students applied on the first day.  The Clubhouse was renovated with 15 classrooms,  two laboratories, a large lecture room, a library and a cafeteria.  The "Normandy Residence Center under the auspices of the University of Missouri" opened in September 1960.  Enrollment increased to 300 in 1961 and 550 in 1962.

Interest in a four-year school immediately arose.  In 1963, the original MU campuses in Columbia and Rolla were merged with the privately owned University of Kansas City to form the present day University of Missouri System.  The newly formed system immediately won permission to upgrade the Normandy center to a full-fledged four-year institution.  The transfer from the Normandy school district to the University of Missouri System was delayed when the Missouri Supreme Court in 4–3 decision ruled that the school could not transfer the property without a formal open bid process.  The Missouri General Assembly enacted legislation signed by Governor John Dalton on October 13, 1963, enabling the transfer and the university bought the property for $60,000 from unallocated funds at the university's disposal.

With expanding enrollment classes were held in a laundromat building at Natural Bridge and Hanley and in a church basement across from the campus while buildings were built on the site of the former Bellerive Country Club. Benton Hall opened in 1965, Clark Hall and the Library were the next buildings built.  On July 23, 1973, an Ozark Airlines Fairchild Hiller FH-227B Flight 809 from Nashville International Airport crashed into the campus just east of the Mark Twain complex while attempting to land at Lambert-St. Louis International Airport. T    In 1976 Marillac College was acquired. It is now called the "south campus."

Chancellors

Chancellors of the school are:

<li>James L. Bugg Jr., 1965–1969
<li>Glen Driscoll, 1969–1972
Everett Walters, interim, 1972–1973
<li>Joseph Hartley, 1973–1974
Emery Turner, interim, 1974–1975
<li>Arnold Grobman, 1975–1985
Arthur MacKinney, interim, 1985–1986
<li>Marguerite Ross Barnett, 1986–1990
<li>Blanche Touhill, 1990–2002
Donald Driemeier, interim, 2003
<li>Thomas F. George, 2003–2019
<li>Kristin Sobolik, 2019–present

Express Scripts World Headquarters Campus at NorthPark
In 2007 Express Scripts opened its world headquarters on the campus north of University Place Drive and south of Interstate 70 in Missouri.  It was the first Fortune 500 company to have its headquarters on a college campus.  A second headquarters building adjoining the original one opened in 2008.  Three additional Express Scripts have been added to the NorthPark development on the north side of I-70 including an Office and Data Center, Tech and Innovation Center, and Operations Center.  In 2018 the majority of the 5,000 St. Louis Express Scripts employees work in the complex.

George Paz, CEO of Express Scripts at the time, was an UMSL graduate.  Express Scripts, which leases rather than owns its headquarters buildings and other structures in NorthPark, received substantial tax breaks.  Since the move the company has been an active partner with the university including contributing money to renovate the computer sciences building (Express Scripts Hall), raising funds for building projects, sponsoring a pre-collegiate bridge program for high school students and sponsoring a business incubator (Accentuate).

Academics

Academic units
Divisions of the university include: the College of Arts and Sciences, the College of Business Administration, the College of Education, the College of Fine Arts and Communication, the College of Nursing, the College of Optometry, the Pierre Laclede Honors College, the School of Social Work, Continuing Education, the Graduate School, and the UMSL/Washington University Joint Undergraduate Engineering Program.

The College of Arts and Sciences has these divisions:

 Anthropology
 Biology
 Chemistry
 Criminology & Criminal Justice
 Economics
 English
 Foreign Language & Literature
 History
 Math & Computer Science
 Music
 Philosophy
 Physics
 Political Science
 Psychology
 Sociology
 School of Social Work
 Institute for Women & Gender Studies

Research and Public Service Centers
The university's centers include: the Center for Business & Industrial Studies, the Center for Character and Citizenship, the Center for Emerging Technologies, the Center for Entrepreneurship and Economic Education, the Center for Ethics and Public Life, the Center for Eye Care, the Center for Excellence in Financial Counseling, the Center for Human Origin and Cultural Diversity, the Center for the Humanities, the Center for International Studies, the Center for Nanoscience, the Center for Neurodynamics, the Center for Transportation Studies, the Center for Trauma Recovery, the Children's Advocacy Services of Greater St. Louis, the E. Desmond Lee Regional Institute of Tutorial Education, the E. Desmond Lee Technology and Learning Center, the German Cultural Center, the International Business Institute, the Missouri Institute of Mental Health, the Nicholas and Theodora Matsakis Hellenic Culture Center, the Public Policy Research Center, St. Louis Public Radio, the Sue Shear Institute for Women in Public Life, and the Whitney R. Harris World Ecology Center.

Rankings
 U.S. News & World Reports America's Best Graduate Schools 2018 ranks its doctoral degree program in Criminology & Criminal Justice 5th in the US. The Department of Criminology & Criminal Justice was also ranked 2nd for scholarly research by the Journal of Criminal Justice.
 The Philosophical Gourmet Report lists UMSL's terminal Master's program in Philosophy in the Top 10 nationally. This report is widely cited as a primary source in ranking Philosophy graduate programs and publishes biennially.
 U.S. News & World Report ranked the International Business Undergraduate program 15th for 2010. That was the 7th time the program was ranked in the Top 20.

Athletics

UMSL provides 11 Division II sports teams ranging from Soccer and Basketball to Golf and Softball.

Campus
The Campus is divided into two parts, a North Campus and a South Campus. UMSL can be visited using the St. Louis MetroLink light rail system which has two stations on the campus: UMSL North and UMSL South.

Some key buildings include the Thomas Jefferson and Mercantile Libraries, the Transportation Studies Center, University Meadows Apartments, the Millennium Student Center, Residential Life and Housing, Clark and Lucas Halls, the Touhill Performing Arts Center, Express Scripts Hall (formally CCB), and the Social Sciences Building. The Ward E. Barnes Library is located on the south campus and serves the College of Education and the College of Optometry. Finally, there is currently a campus recreation center.

Student life

Housing
Campus Housing: Villa North Hall (Ages 21+) and Oak Hall (Under 21).

Additional Campus Living:  University Meadows Apartments (independently operated, gated, apartment style living), The Mansion Hills (Ages 21+ )

Student Government Association
The UMSL Student Government Association (SGA) is a student run government set up to provide a voice for students when dealing with administration of the University of Missouri–St. Louis (UMSL). SGA has three parts, the Executive Branch, the Assembly, and the Student Court, and also is governed by a student wide approved constitution. SGA was started in 1963 when the university was founded and has gone through many constitutional changes, the most recent in 2004. SGA includes members from every student organization and students from every college on campus. This government incorporates both undergraduate and graduate in its student body. SGA has been instrumental in changes for students around the campus. It is responsible for approving student fees before they go to the board of curators of the University of Missouri System and divides out the campus Activity's Fees to fund student organizations' budgets.

Greek life 
There are six social fraternities and sororities on campus.  The Fraternities are Sigma Tau Gamma, Sigma Pi, and Alpha Sigma Phi.  Sororities include: Alpha Xi Delta, Delta Zeta, Zeta Tau Alpha. The co-education service Fraternity is Alpha Phi Omega.

There are also historically Black Greek letter organizations (BGLO) that function at the University of Missouri St. Louis campus. Majority of the BGLO chapters function as citywide chapters including Alpha Phi Alpha, Alpha Kappa Alpha, Kappa Alpha Psi, Omega Psi Phi, Delta Sigma Theta, Phi Beta Sigma, and Zeta Phi Beta, while Sigma Gamma Rho has a charter specifically at the University of Missouri St. Louis.

Student media
The student newspaper, The Current, is a tabloid publishing 6,000 issues weekly. It is funded primarily by advertising revenue supplemented by student activity fees.  It won "Best-in-State" from the Missouri Collegiate Media Association in 2002, 2007, 2008, and 2009. The campus hosts a student radio station, UMSL Student Radio ("The U") on 1620 AM and streaming online and U TV which streams in the campus dorms and YouTube channel  . The main studios are located in the    Millennium Student Center, with a satellite studio in the Oak Hall Residence. The stations is organized by the Student Electronic Media Professional's Association (SEMPA). The U has a non-commercial freeform format, playing various genres of music and talk shows as well as programs featuring campus news and personalities. The Film Production Society was established in 2006. This organization has since changed its name to The Media Production Society. It manufactures original content, tutors students in need, and researches new forms of modern media.

Nickname and mascot
In May 2007 the UMSL board of curators approved a change of nickname from the Rivermen (first used in the 1960s) to the Tritons. The new mascot was revealed at the 'Pack the Stands' night, Fall 2009 and was named Louie by the student body at the annual Mirthday celebration, Spring 2010. The Rivermen/Riverwomen nickname seldom had popular support, primarily for its unwieldy gender constructions.

Institutional Safety
Law enforcement and emergency response on the UMSL campus is handled by the University of Missouri-St. Louis Police Department.

Other divisions within Institutional Safety include: Department of Environmental Health and Safety, Parking and Transportation, and Campus Locksmiths.

Pierre Laclede Honors College
The 'Pierre Laclede Honors College' is the honors program for the University of Missouri–St. Louis. It was named in honor of the founder of the city of St. Louis. With classrooms and student housing both located in a former convent on the university's South Campus, the program offers classes that typically focus on specific topics in the Humanities while stressing the development and practice of students' writing skills. The students in the program publish an informal periodical, Brain Stew, which is independent of The Current. The college is also the center of activity for the publication of Bellerive, an annual literary magazine which contains artistic and literary works by UMSL students and faculty.

Alumni
The university has 92,230 graduates, with 62,408 (68%) of them in the metropolitan St. Louis area.

Notable faculty
 Ihsan Ali Al-Shehbaz, Adjunct Professor of Biology and Curator at the Missouri Botanical Gardens
 Joseph Carroll, Curators' Professor of English, pioneering scholar in the field of literature and evolution 
 Janet Catherine Berlo, Art History Professor (1979–1997)
 Michael Cosmopoulos, Hellenic Government-Karakas Foundation Chair of Greek Studies and Professor of Archaeology 
 Barbara Harbach, Professor of Music 
 Minsoo Kang, Professor of History 
 Mark Pope, Thomas Jefferson Professor, Curators' Distinguished Professor Emeritus of Counseling (1997–2018)
 George Rawick 
 Robert E. Ricklefs, Curators' Professor of Biology, Member of the National Academy of Sciences
 Lawrence H. White 
 Peter F. Stevens 
 Daniel Isom Former St. Louis Police Department Chief of Police, E. Desmond Lee Professor of Policing and the Community

Notable alumni
 Paul Curtman – Republican member of the Missouri House of Representatives
 Kathleen E. Fick – Air National Guard Major General
 Chuck Gatschenberger – Republican member of the Missouri House of Representatives
 Maryanne J. George - American Christian musician
 Timothy P. Green – Missouri State Politician
 Marty Hendin – Former Vice President of Community relations for the St. Louis Cardinals
 Charles E. Hoffman - Dean of Business School (2013- )
 Joan Kelly Horn – Former United States Congresswoman
 Daniel Isom – Former St. Louis City Chief of Police
 William Knoedelseder - Pulitzer Prize-winning author, former business writer for the Los Angeles Times and TV producer
 Kevin Mansell – Chief Executive Officer of Kohl's Corporation
 Natalie Sago – NBA referee
 Therese Sander – Missouri Politician
 Vincent Schoemehl – Mayor of the City of St. Louis, 1981–1993
 Phyllis Smith – Television and film actress
 Chrissy Sommer – Republican member of the Missouri House of Representatives
 Steve Stenger – Former Democratic politician and former County Executive of St. Louis County
 Steven Tilley – Missouri Speaker of the House of Representatives
 Clint Zweifel – Missouri State Treasurer
 Lyda Krewson - Mayor of the City of St. Louis, 2017–2021

References

External links 

 
 UMSL Athletics website

 
Public universities and colleges in Missouri
Educational institutions established in 1963
Universities and colleges in St. Louis County, Missouri
Optometry schools in the United States
1963 establishments in Missouri